Shin Young-chol (born 14 March 1986) is a South Korean footballer, who plays as midfielder.

Club career statistics

References

External links

 

1986 births
Living people
Association football midfielders
South Korean footballers
South Korean expatriate footballers
Seongnam FC players
K League 1 players
Expatriate footballers in Thailand
South Korean expatriate sportspeople in Thailand
People from Seongnam
Sportspeople from Gyeonggi Province